Lonely Joe is a 2009 horror film which stars Erica Leerhsen. The film has been said to be a Supernatural Horror/Thriller "in the veins of Saw and The Sixth Sense". The film is inspired by real events that took place in South Texas in the 1980s.

Plot
Lonely Joe revolves around Michele Connelly (Erica Leerhsen), a New York City reporter who returns to her hometown 10 years after the mysterious murder of her younger brother to investigate and find out what actually happened several years ago. However, soon after Michele discovers a trail of bodies dating back more than fifty years, she finds herself feeling as if she is part of the story she is investigating.

Cast

Production
Lonely Joe began production in October 2007, in the towns of Solvay, Syracuse, Elbridge, and Geddes, New York. The film wrapped principal photography on November 6, 2007. A "post-production teaser" was cut from dailies, and placed on-line on November 7, 2007.

Doing her own stunts for the film, Erica Leerhsen was nearly hit by the train used in the dream sequence when she lost her balance and lunged forward. Her scene was shot with her only 12 inches from the side of the train as it passed by at 30 miles per hour. Unshaken, she insisted on shooting the scene again.

References

External links
 

2009 films
American supernatural horror films
2009 horror films
2000s English-language films
2000s American films